Lolah-ye Gaw Kush ( is a mountain in Afghanistan.

Hindu Kush
Two-thousanders of Afghanistan
Landforms of Kapisa Province